Richard Becker (born 29 January 1991) is a former German professional tennis player.

Career
He trains at the Schüttler Waske Tennis-University. His favourite surface is clay.

External links
 
 

1991 births
Living people
German male tennis players